Wu Pingfeng (born November 1, 1981) is a Chinese footballer currently plays for Shenzhen Xinqiao F.C. at Chinese Football Association Member Association Champions League.

Club career
Wu Pingfeng started his professional football career with Guangdong Xiongying in 2002, who were in the third tier of the Chinese league system. At the beginning of the 2003 league season, Guangdong Xiongying were promoted to the second tier of Chinese league system and Wu Pingfeng had established himself within the squad by playing in twenty-five league games. Wu Pingfeng's second season at Guangdong saw him established within the team when he played in twenty-four league games and scored two goals for them. Despite a productive season with the team established within the league, the team had to be disbanded.

Wu transferred to another second-tier club Jiangsu Sainty and established himself as a squad regular by playing in twenty-three league games and scoring two goals. He continued to play for Jiangsu Sainty for three seasons where he played his part in their attempts to push for promotion before he joined already promoted Guangzhou Evergrande at the beginning of the 2008 Chinese Super League season.

Along with his teammates Jiang Ning and Li Jianhua, Wu transferred to Guangzhou Evergrande's opponent Guangzhou R&F in January 2013. He announced his retirement in November 2014.

International career
Wu Pingfeng made his first appearance for the Chinese national football team in Bahrain on 7 December 2002, in a friendly match against Syria. His second international cap for China came when he was called to the China national team by José Camacho in October 2011 and played for China on 11 October 2011 in a 1–0 home defeat against Iraq, coming on as a substitute for Yu Hanchao in the second half.

Career statistics

Honours

Club
Guangzhou Evergrande
Chinese Super League: 2011, 2012
China League One: 2010
Chinese FA Cup: 2012
Chinese FA Super Cup: 2012

References

External links
 
Player profile at Guangzhou Pharmaceutical website

1981 births
Living people
People from Zhongshan
Chinese footballers
Footballers from Zhongshan
Guangzhou F.C. players
Jiangsu F.C. players
Guangzhou City F.C. players
Chinese Super League players
China League One players
Association football wingers
China international footballers